Charles John Cameron (22 November 1907 – 12 February 1960) was an Australian rules footballer who played with North Melbourne and Fitzroy in the Victorian Football League (VFL).

Cameron, who played as a wingman, joined North Melbourne in just their second VFL season. While at North Melbourne he regularly represented the Victorian interstate side, appearing in a total of 11 games including at the 1930 Adelaide Carnival. He was North's playing coach for four games in 1932.

Dick Taylor was appointed captain-coach in  1932. He got suspended after a fiery game and was barred from coaching for 4 weeks. Charlie acted as caretaker coach during Taylor's absence.  

During the 1934 season Cameron crossed to Fitzroy and was used as a forward, kicking 23 goals in his first season and 24 in his second. He captained the club in 1935 and later, in 1948, returned as their non-playing coach for the year.

References

External Links 

1907 births
North Melbourne Football Club players
North Melbourne Football Club coaches
Fitzroy Football Club players
Fitzroy Football Club coaches
Australian rules footballers from Victoria (Australia)
1960 deaths